Hebrew Gospel can refer to:

 Gospel of the Hebrews, a syncretic Jewish–Christian text believed to have been composed in Koine Greek
 Hebrew Gospel hypothesis, traditions of a version of Matthew's gospel supposed to have been written by him “in the Hebrew language” (Papias)
 Hebrew Gospel of Matthew, 1385, a rabbinical translation of Matthew's gospel
 Bible translations into Hebrew, including a translation of the Gospels into Modern Hebrew